The 2016–17 Saint Mary's Gaels men's basketball team represented Saint Mary's College of California during the 2016–17 NCAA Division I men's basketball season. This was head coach Randy Bennett's 16th season at Saint Mary's. The Gaels competed in the West Coast Conference and played their home games at the McKeon Pavilion in Moraga, California. They finished the season 29–5, 16–2 in WCC play to finish in second place. In the WCC tournament, they defeated Portland and BYU before losing to Gonzaga in the championship game. They received an at-large bid to the NCAA tournament. As the No. 7 seed in the West region, they beat VCU in the first round before losing to No. 2-seeded Arizona in the second round.

Previous season
The Gaels finished the 2015–16 season 29–6, 15–3 in WCC play to win a share of the WCC regular season conference championship. They defeated Loyola Marymount and Pepperdine to advance to the championship game of the WCC tournament where they lost to Gonzaga. As a regular season conference champion and No. 1 seed in their conference tournament who failed to win their conference tournament, they received an automatic bid to the National Invitation Tournament. As a No. 2 seed in the NIT, they defeated New Mexico State and Georgia to advance to the quarterfinals before losing to Valparaiso.

Offseason

Departures

2016 recruiting class

2017 recruiting class

Preseason
The Gaels were picked to finish second in the WCC preseason poll. Emmett Naar, Dane Pineau, and Joe Rahon were selected to the All-WCC preseason team. The Gaels were ranked No. 17 in the preseason AP poll and No. 19 in the preseason Coaches Poll.

Roster

Schedule and results

|-
!colspan=9 style=| Non-conference regular season

|-
!colspan=9 style=| WCC regular season

|-
!colspan=9 style=| WCC tournament

|-
!colspan=9 style=| NCAA tournament

Rankings

*AP does not release post-NCAA tournament rankings

References

Saint Mary's
Saint Mary's Gaels men's basketball seasons
Saint Mary's
Saint Mary's
Saint Mary's